This is a list of wildlife management areas in the Canadian province of Manitoba. Wildlife management areas are designated by the Government of Manitoba under The Wildlife Act.  For a list of all protected areas in Manitoba, see the List of protected areas of Manitoba.

References

Manitoba
Wildlife management areas